Michael Joseph Shortley (October 5, 1893 – April 28, 1961) was an American football player and coach. He served as the head football coach at Duquesne University in Pittsburgh, Pennsylvania in 1924, compiling a record of 2–4–2. Shortley played college football at Duquesne and the Catholic University of America in Washington, D.C. He later held a number of positions in public service, including at the Social Security Administration and Federal Security Agency.

Head coaching record

References

External links
 

1893 births
1961 deaths
American football halfbacks
American football quarterbacks
Catholic University Cardinals football players
Duquesne Dukes football coaches
Duquesne Dukes football players
People from Allegheny County, Pennsylvania
Coaches of American football from Pennsylvania
Players of American football from Pennsylvania